Hardow Rud (also Romanized as Hardow Rūd; also known as Hardo Rūd) is a village in Nowkand Kola Rural District, in the Central District of Qaem Shahr County, Mazandaran Province, Iran. At the 2006 census, its population was 824, in 218 families.

References 

Populated places in Qaem Shahr County